Bomb is a Canadian Army Sherman Tank of the 27th Armoured Regiment (The Sherbrooke Fusilier Regiment) which landed at D-Day and fought across northwest Europe until the end of World War II, one of the few Canadian tanks that fought without interruption from D-Day to VE Day. Today Bomb is preserved at the William Street Armoury in Sherbrooke, Quebec.

Origins

Bomb was built at General Motors' Fisher Tank Arsenal in Flint, Michigan as an M4A2 Sherman Tank, serial number 8007, the 898th vehicle built at the arsenal. It was shipped to England, where it was issued with the War Department number T-152656. The tank was assigned to B Squadron of the Sherbrooke Fusiliers as the regiment converted from older training tanks to new Shermans in preparation for the invasion of France as part of the 2nd Canadian Armoured Brigade. The tanks of B Squadron all had names that started with B such as Barbara and Be Good. The name Bomb was inspired by the cap badge of the fusiliers which features a stylized grenade. The original crew was led by crew commander Sergeant Harold Futter. The driver was Lance-Corporal Rudy Moreault with co-driver Trooper "Red" Fletcher. The gunner was Trooper A.W. Rudolph and Trooper J.W. (Tiny) Hall was the loader.

Crew members in order of arrival

Sergeant Harold A. Futter, hometown unknown, crew commander (landed in June, wounded July)
Trooper James. R. “Red” Fletcher, from Timmins, Ontario, loader-operator (landed in June, wounded July)

Lance-Corporal J.G.R. “Rudy” Moreault, from Montreal, driver (landed in June, crew for the duration)

Trooper Jack W. “Tiny” Hall, from Creston, BC, co-driver until July, then loader-operator (landed in June, crew for the duration) 
Trooper Alfred. W Rudolph, from Claresholm, Alberta, gunner (landed in June, crew for the duration)
Lieutenant Paul W. Ayriss, from Victoria, BC, crew commander (replacement in July, wounded in September)

Trooper Ken R Gerow, from Burns Lake, BC, co-driver, (replacement in July, crew for the duration).  Surname is spelled Jeroux in the shot list for Green Fields Beyond.

Lieutenant John W. Neill MC, from Oshawa, Ontario, crew commander (replacement in September, wounded in late February).

Lieutenant Walter M. White, from West Gore, Nova Scotia, crew commander (replacement in March, wounded April)

Lieutenant Ernest Mingo, from Tatamagouche, Nova Scotia, crew commander (replacement in April, crew for the duration)

Technical description of Bomb

The following paragraphs describe the present-day elements of Bomb in the context of scholarship to describe its place among the 49,234-odd M4 tanks manufactured between 1941 and 1945.  By examining high resolution photographs of each component against recognized technical chronologies, an informed statement is possible to identify where and when a part was made.  Model builders and technical historians take note; casual readers may have difficulty following the flow.  The two principal references are Pierre-Olivier Buan, Joe DeMarco and Leife Hulbert on “Sherman Minutia Website”, and Chris Conners’ American Fighting Vehicle Database.

The essential stepping off identification is that British War Department registration number T152656 was an M4A2, according to the American naming conventions, and according to British naming conventions a Sherman III.  History now knows the tank as Bomb and it was made by Fisher Tank Division of General Motors, at the Grand Blanc Plant on South Saginaw Street, Flint, Michigan.  It was assigned hull Serial Number 8007, and a registration number believed to be 3063256.  It was one of 432 tanks produced in November 1942, with serial numbers between 7769 and 8200.  The United States had thrown its production might into the war effort, and in late spring 1942 issued US Ordnance production order T-3195 for another 2000 tanks.  This was the second of four orders to Fisher between April 1942 and February 1944, and spanned August 1942 to March 1943.  Bomb is one of over 4600 M4A2s made by Fisher in 25 months.  Whether the order was intended for US service or Lend-Lease delivery to the British is unknown.  However, in June 1942 President Roosevelt offered anything British Prime Minister Churchill needed for the North African campaign.  Over the late summer there was an emergency dispatch of over 400 tanks and self-propelled artillery to Africa.  The Sherman's combat debut came with the British at the Second Battle of El Alamein in late October 1942.  Bomb was constructed the month after; no doubt by workers who recognized the importance of their jobs.

Nomenclature

From the factory, serial number 8007 was equipped with a General Motors (GM) 6046 twin inline-six diesel engine.  That engine was removed when Bomb returned to Canada.  This was one of four standardized powerplants, which included the original Continental 9-cylinder R975 radial aircraft engine, the Ford GAA gasoline V8, and a 30-cylinder Chrysler multibank of five engine blocks on one crankcase.  Each was an interesting engineering answer to the constantly increasing demand for tank engines.  The GM 6046 consisted of two off-the-shelf GM 6-71 diesel truck engines connected with a transfer case to a single drive shaft.  Unlike other models of Sherman which have doors on the rear hull, this engine was serviced from the top through large doors on the engine deck.  With the exception of 490 M4A2 diesels issued to the US Marines, all diesel Shermans were shipped to Britain, Free French forces or the Soviet Union as Lend-Lease.  The explanation was simple: the US military had standardized on gasoline as a fuel, and did not want vehicles with non-standard fuel.  The main tank fuel capacity of the M4A2 .  Those tanks are located on the left and right rear hull sponsons, above the tracks.  As Bomb sits on display, the latest restoration removed all fuel, grease and oil in its tanks and components.

Hull details

On the continuum of M4A2 tanks, Bomb is considered late production, and has small grille engine deck plates.  It has the Fisher-fabricated-style bullet splash guard at front of the engine deck doors under rear lip of the turret.  The exhaust stacks are across the rear of the hull below the line of the upper armour.  The rear upper hull is sloped, and has the Fisher simplified six-bolt rear engine deck plates configuration.  There are welding scars where various fittings like the tail lights and fuel can holders were removed over time.  In the extreme left and right upper corners of the rear sponsons are two small storage compartments intended for extra track grousers.  Their cover doors have been welded shut.

Moving forward, the Quick-Fix appliqué armour plates on the sidewalls indicate dry-stowage ammunition racks inside.  The front glacis plate is the early 57° angle.  The driver and co-driver have small hatches, and the characteristic cast "narrow" drivers' hood with direct vision slots but no additional Quick-Fix driver's hood additional front armour.  Review of photos indicates the equilibrator springs on front hatches are missing.  However, there are remnants of the fixtures for the "driver's hatch hood and windshield."  The bow M1919A4 machine gun canvas dustcover's slot-style fitting is still present, although the ball mount itself has been removed and the opening plated over for display.  The base for the high control radio antenna is present, and likewise blanked over.  It has a one-piece rounded nose drawing E 4186 differential housing with the characteristic mid-production shot-defection lip for the bolt heads.  Missing from the front glacis are the headlights and guards, and siren.  However, there are welding scars and remnant bars on the front glacis, which correspond to where extra track sections were attached in Normandy to defeat German tank and anti-tank guns projectiles.  The lifting eyes are the padded style, and the tow hooks themselves are missing.

The running gear is US-made Sherman not Canadian-made Vertical Volute Spring System (VVSS), with rear offset return rollers.  It appears to have its original M4 bogies, and are the early configuration of swing arms without adjustment wrench holes.  These are the early return roller assembly with horizontal return roller brackets, and mid production or asymmetric return skids.  A keen eye will spot that the return rollers were never retrofitted with the 1" spacer risers.  There is a mix of welded spoke and pressed spoke roadwheels, which suggest field repairs where the originals were damaged. However, for a wartime survivor, the rubber is in very good condition, which suggests postwar replacement versus wartime repairs.  The rear idler wheels are welded six-spoke style.  The right-side sprocket is a cast style with dimples.  The left-side sprocket is a plate steel WW2 simplified pattern.  There is no way to tell if either or none are original, but the sprocket notches wear out as the track mileage increases.  There is a mixture of track types, including ‘T62 Steel, rolled sections chevron grouser riveted’ with the characteristic rounded rivet heads, and ‘T54E1 Steel, fabricated, chevron grouser’ with the characteristic central tab on the long edge.  The end connectors are various types, many showing signs of broken grousers.

Turret and armament

The turret is drawing number D 50878, serial number 303, cast by Continental-Wheeling, the heat treatment lot not visible, and several original tie-down loops are present.  The 75 mm gun was likely produced by GM Oldsmobile Division.  It is mounted on an early-pattern rotator M34 gun mount.  Several features are notable including the gun shield lifting rings are positioned close to rotor shield.  Bomb does not have the later M34A1 with characteristic ears on the sides of the barrel.  The gun-mount bolts are exposed, not protected behind the outer edges of mount.  It is the so-called low turret bustle.  There is a pistol port and door on the left side of turret.  The crew commander's hatch has the low-profile split hatch cupola.  The external fittings on the hatch are missing, including any hatch lock mechanisms.  The .50-calibre Browning anti-aircraft mount is damaged.  Since two crew members were wounded and evacuated in June 1944 when an enemy shell impacted the anti-aircraft machine gun, it is an unanswered question whether the mount was ever returned to original condition.  This model turret did not have a loader's hatch.  The single roof vent is located central and forward.  The gunner's vane sight is present, but no spot light base or periscope sight remain.  The typical high-mounted turret lifting eyes are located around the sides.

Battle service

Bomb landed at Juno Beach on D-Day, June 6, 1944, with the Sherbrooke Fusilier Regiment at Bernières-sur-Mer and was almost immediately involved in fighting at Authie and Buron where the Fusiliers destroyed 41 tanks in their first two days of fighting. Even more intense tank battles followed in Normandy, as German Panzer and SS units tried to crush the Allied beachhead, while the Allies sought to break out. The tank fought in the actions around Caen, including the costly fighting on Bourguébus Ridge, and the capture and clearing of the city of Falaise. The tank started with the call sign 22, but in July the Fusilier tank troops were re-organized and Bomb became a troop command tank with the call sign 21 painted on the turret.

Sergeant Futter, the crew commander and Trooper Red Fletcher, the driver, were wounded by shell fragments in Normandy in July 1944 and were replaced by Lieutenant Paul Ayriss and Trooper Ken Gerow.  A month later, Lieutenant J.W. Neill replaced Ayriss as commander of the tank, and was later awarded the Military Cross. In the Netherlands, Walter White of West Gore, Nova Scotia, took command of the tank and led B Squadron of the Sherbrookes from Bomb.  After fighting in the Hochwald Forest in Germany, White led a reconnaissance to the banks of the Rhine River. Lieutenant White was injured by shrapnel in his leg a few weeks later during fighting in Deventer. Lieutenant Ernest Mingo, from Tatamagouche, Nova Scotia, took command of the tank. The regiments and its tanks cleared German army units along the IJsselmeer and through the northern Netherlands and pushed into Germany. The tank fought off fanatical German attacks in the final days of the war, as German frontal attacks left the fields in front of the Fusiliers covered with the bodies of German troops. Finally, in the border town of Emden, Lieutenant Mingo received news from the tank's radio, "Unload, clear guns, the war is over." By VE Day, the tank had fired 6,000 rounds in battle. It survived two hits from enemy shells and was quickly repaired by its own crew, never missing a day of action. Bomb was one of the few Canadian tanks to fight without interruption from D-Day to VE Day. The tank and crew members Rudolph, Moreault and Hall were the subject of a Canadian Army Film and Photo Unit short documentary made in 1945 entitled The Green Fields Beyond (number 2090) in 1945.

Bomb landed at Juno Beach on D-Day, June 6, 1944, with the Sherbrooke Fusilier Regiment (SFR) (27th Canadian Armoured Regiment) at Bernières-sur-Mer.  Bomb served continuously in B Squadron for 11 months, and participated in every major operation of the regiment until VE-Day.

In the afternoon of D-Day, the SFR's three untested but thoroughly prepared tank squadrons and regimental headquarters crossed the newly liberated beaches.  The landing itself was unopposed and the tanks barely got wet.  Falling short of their assigned objectives due to traffic congestion, road damage, and a cautious pace, the regiment formed a defensive harbour formation overnight to prepare for the next day.  During that first night, a German anti-tank gun fired at Bomb but missed.  One of the accompanying tanks, a mine-clearing Flail, fired back destroying the anti-tank gun.

On the morning of June 7, the SFR's advance resumed.  The Germans held their fire and adjusted their defences to make contact with the SFR at Authie and Buron.  In two days of intense combat, the Canadian tankers destroyed 41 enemy Panther and PzKw IV tanks.[3]  Two of those kills were Bomb.  B Squadron started the battle with 15 Shermans and emerged with five tanks fit for battle, including Bomb.  The other two squadrons were just as badly mauled.  The SFR, 2nd Canadian Armoured Brigade's two other regiments emerged from the congested beachhead and took over the line, allowing the Sherbrookes to pull back and recover.  After 11 days in reserve, the three fighting squadrons were rebuilt with serviceable, recovered and replacement tanks.  Replacement crews from the echelons took over from casualties. Sgt Futter, who had commanded Bomb, was named Troop Sergeant of 2 Troop of B Squadron.  The rest of June saw constant manoeuvring and probing, with frequent alerts always facing enemy fire.

By early July, the front had advanced to northwest of Caen.  On 8 July an enemy shell hit the .50-cal anti-aircraft machine-gun on Bomb turret.  Crew commander Sgt Futter and loader-operator Tpr Fletcher were wounded inside the turret by the blast.  Their replacements were crew member Tpr Gerow and crew commander Lt Ayriss.  With a new commander, Bomb became the 1 Troop Leader's tank.  The original radio call sign on the rear of the turret was 22 (‘two-two’).  When the troops were reorganized, Bomb was repainted with the call sign 21 (‘two-one’).[5]

Later in July near to Bourguébus Ridge, in the Allies’ push south towards Falaise[4], a Panzer IV fired at and hit a spare road wheel mounted on Bomb hull.  Expecting a follow-up shot, the crew bailed out.  When there was no second shot, they inspected the damage, and decided it was insignificant.  The crews and their officers appreciated the value of external layers of track sections, road wheels and stowage boxes, even though rear echelon technical staff disapproved.  Two more enemy tanks were knocked out by Bomb in the fighting for Verrières Ridge, bringing the count to four.

The Canadian Corps’ concentrated and unrelenting operations had depleted the enemy's ability to defend along multiple axes of attack.  Hoping to bowl the Germans backwards, phase one of Operation TRACTABLE on the west side of the Liaze River, had infantry and attached SFR tank squadrons pressing towards the village of Clair Tizon south of Bretteville-sur-la-Laize.  On 14 August, an RAF bomber mission was planned against German defences on a hill between the two villages.  However, there was a miscalculation with identification smoke signals and some bombs landed amongst B Squadron's tanks.  Bomb sustained unspecified damage.  A 1945 newspaper story in the Sherbrooke Daily Record mentions a shell striking a drive sprocket without explaining where or which side.  There are no other mobility casualty events in the records mentioning Bomb, therefore this incident may explain Bomb mismatched front sprockets.  A week later, Bomb was repaired and rejoined the squadron for the attacks on Falaise.

In the closing weeks of August, as the Canadians, British and Polish divisions squeezed the Falaise Gap closed from the north against encircling American forces, the Germans fought just as hard to escape towards the east.  On 17 August while Bomb was supporting the Fusiliers de Montréal in a disorganized close range skirmish to clear a walled school compound, a German infantry anti-tank rocket hit a track link welded to Bomb turret.  Again, there was no significant damage.

Even while the Falaise Pocket was collapsing, the Britain and Canadian armoured divisions turned left to pursue German units retreating out of Normandy.  From their position on the east end of the pocket, the SFR was ordered to move quickly towards the Seine River to secure strategic routes into northern France, Belgium and the Netherlands.  Command staff had recognized that the hard surface roads were undamaged and would be needed for main supply routes until other seaports could be liberated.  Therefore, all steel tracked combat vehicles had to stay off the roads.  With limited maps, the regiment's recce troop of Stuart tanks looped back and forth to escort packets of tanks and other vehicles following along the edges of fields and down narrow trails.  During this road move, Bomb suffered a burnt out clutch and was late arriving in the staging area.  In early September in the Forêt de la Londe near Elbeuf, understrength Canadian infantry brigades tangled disastrously with rearguard German units with heavy losses.  Lt Ayriss was reported injured in that fighting.

Bräun's regimental history records Lt Neill taking command of Bomb in Falaise under fire on 17 August when Lt Ayriss was to be promoted (page 426).  However, elsewhere (page 738) Lt not Capt Ayriss was still the crew commander in September.  His name does not appear on the casualty lists for August or September (pages 480, 546–548).  Capt. Ayriss appears in subsequent chapters, so he was eventually promoted.

Setting aside the confusion of start dates, Lt Neill replaced Lt Ayriss and commanded Bomb through the fall and early winter of 1944–45.  His determined actions in the breakout from Cleve earned him an immediate Military Cross.  The citation is summarized below:
Neill, John Wesley MC Immediate April 1945

In the breakout from CLEVE in late February 1945, Lt Neill was leading a B Sqn troop of four tanks and a column of Kangaroo APCs.  With darkness, smoke, mud, artillery and mortar fire, vehicle and personnel casualties, lagging infantry, and just about everything against him, Neill dashed forward with another tank to secure the objective and hold it for the trailing APCs to catch up and fully ‘consolidate without appreciable loss’.

During autumn 1944, the regiment was shared out to several British infantry divisions, the Irish Guards division, and the American 82nd Airborne, as well as Canadian formations.  As in Normandy, the squadrons and troops were attached and detached as required to infantry battalions for fire support.  The terrain was not advantageous for tank operations, and the squadrons suffered during the prolonged attrition.  For their determination and contribution to the battle, the SFR was awarded the battle honours, Antwerp–Turnhout Canal and Battle of the Scheldt
  
As winter set in the regiment had periods of idleness due to bad weather, lack of replacement crews and tanks, and supply shortages.  That said the maintainers were kept busy.  Bräun mentions Bomb received new engines on one occasion, and a new set of tracks on another.  A careful read of the history indicates this heavy maintenance was vital to preserve the combat power of the regiment.  For example, the heavy mud encountered in the winter battles of 1945 severely limited the tanks’ mobility.  One SFR squadron complained about wearing out their tanks’ clutches.  
When was Lt Neill wounded?
Emmerich and Hoch heights?

Lt Neill's replacement was Lt White, who took command of the tank and for a short period led B Squadron of the Sherbrookes from Bomb.  Lt White was already an experienced armoured soldier in another regiment, having risen to Sergeant Major before taking his commission and attending Sandhurst Military College.  Postwar White recalled the names of the other troop tanks as, Barbara, Be Good, and Bohunk.  After fighting in the Hochwald Forest in Germany, White claimed to have led a reconnaissance to the banks of the Rhine River.  Bomb fifth and last confirmed tank kill was in Deventer in April 1945.  Six weeks after assuming command, Lt White was wounded while dismounted during the offensive to capture the Pimple on Calcar Ridge, near Deventer.[7]

After Lt White was evacuated, Lt Mingo joined the veteran crew and remained as crew commander until the war's end.  The regiment's tanks cleared enemy units along the Ijsselmeer, through northern Netherlands and into Germany.  Mingo's postwar accounts of the final days described wasteful enemy counterattacks that left the fields in front of the Fusiliers’ positions covered with German dead.[8]  Finally, in the border town of Emden, Netherlands Lt Mingo received news from the tank's radio, "Unload, clear guns, the war is over."

By VE Day, the tank had fired 6,000 rounds in battle, had five enemy tank kills, two engines, two set of tracks, two direct hits from enemy shells and once by an infantry anti-tank rocket, yet always ready for the next battle.[9]  Bomb was one of two Canadian tanks to fight without interruption from D-Day to VE Day.[10] The tank and crew members Rudolph, Moreault and Hall were the subject of a Canadian Army Film and Photo Unit short documentary made in 1945 entitled The Green Fields Beyond (number 2090) in 1945.[11]  The other survivor is Holy Roller with the 1st Hussars, and it is preserved in London, Ontario.

Amphibious conversion?

A story has emerged from on-line biographies of crew members Lt White and Tpr Hall about how Bomb crossed the Rhine.  The suggestion is during the March 1945 battles for a bridgehead across the Rhine, the Troop's tanks including Bomb were fitted with inflatable flotation gear and compressed air systems.  They supposedly floated across the Rhine.  Three of the tanks landed together and Bomb landed slightly further downstream.  The appearance of tanks apparently surprised and overwhelmed the Germans.  This story is implausible based on the War Diaries, period documents including Corps level orders, and secondary sources.  Jackson's 1950s regimental history has no mention of such a crossing.  Surely, the unit's paid biographer would have highlighted such audacity?

Completing four impromptu amphibious tank conversions challenge the canons of technical knowledge of the M4A2 tank and European theatre employment of amphibious Shermans.  Higher command strictly planned and coordinated the Rhine crossings, and the SFR was not directly involved.  Yes, the two other units in 2nd Canadian Armoured Brigade for the earlier D-Day Normandy landings used so-called Duplex Drive (DD) propeller-driven Shermans with canvas and rubber screens.  However, the SFR was not equipped for an amphibious assault to swim onto contested beaches.  The SFR's D-Day objectives were well inland from the beaches.  Its orders were to land from Land Ship Tank LSTs on beaches already secured by other units.  In England, the regiment trained from 1943 onward to operate from LSTs, and laboriously waterproofed every vehicle for the eventual short and anticlimactic exposure to seawater.

Secondly, the story relies on the presumption of permission to divert skilled mechanics’ attention, to locate specialised parts and waterproof sealing compounds, to find time away from combat for float testing, and to summon expertise to extensively modify four ordinary tanks.  At this late stage of the war, almost all ranks in the SFR were replacements and not D-Day landing veterans.  Isolated from technical sources in England, who would have known what to do?

Then there is the unstated exertion command and obeying orders.  Would the Commanding Officer, who only joined the SFR in January, and higher headquarters have risked an impromptu, uncoordinated, amphibious crossing by only four Shermans, especially considering localized floods, the extremely wide channel, and unknown river currents?  There were other better-suited tracked amphibious vehicles available to transport infantry such as the Buffalo and the Terrapin.  The battle procedure for infantry cooperation was well known and finely executed.  Why change what was working?  If anything the past months had taught the Canadians, it was that infantry, artillery and engineers must support tanks, and tanks by themselves are in peril.

Finally, at that late stage of the war the Canadian Army was nursing tired and worn out tanks and trucks, hoping to get through the next foreseeable battles with as few casualties as possible.  Sustained and significant personnel casualties since Normandy challenged the Army's ability to generate even minimally trained replacements.

The conclusion is both tales are uncharacteristic examples of wartime braggadocio and uninformed embellishment.  Were the veterans telling a tall tale?  Were they confident not be found out?  Or on the other hand, did their biographers unquestioningly repeat ‘Granddad’s beery war stories’?

Shot list for 1945 NFB film “Green Fields Beyond” Fonds/collection: CANADA. DEPARTMENT OF NATIONAL DEFENCE / MINISTÈRE DE LA DÉFENSE NATIONALE, Item number (ISN): 193970, Title: Green Fields Beyond, Accession number: 1982-0246
https://numerique.banq.qc.ca/patrimoine/details/52327/2754531?docref=NjSTbE4HeU9VUL45C5NnFQ

Final words

Tank Bomb SN 8007 was built as US registration number 3063256.  In Canadian service she was War Department CT 152656.  It fought from D-Day to VE Day in B Squadron, 27th Canadian Armoured Regiment (Sherbrooke Fusilier Regiment), 2nd Canadian Armoured Brigade.  Bomb was a combat tank with enemy kills, was hit and damaged by enemy fire but never knocked out.  She suffered crew casualties, earned crew honours, and has the rare distinction of improbably surviving so much combat.  War Department CT 152655 number immediately preceded Bomb.  That tank was christened Holy Roller, and she landed on D-Day with Regimental Headquarters Squadron, 1st Hussars, and served with from D-Day to VE Day as well.  Holy Roller was a commander's tank, and although effective leaders lead from the front, Holy Roller does not have the same combat record as Bomb.

Preservation

Bomb was rescued from a Belgian scrapyard to be shipped to Canada. It was one of four Canadian tanks shipped from service in Northwestern Europe to preservation in Canada, along with Forceful III in Ottawa and Holy Roller in London, Ontario. The tank was on display at the Champs de Mars Park in Sherbrooke, Quebec, and later moved to the front lawns of the William Street Armoury. The armoury was the base of the Sherbrooke Regiment, one of the two militia units that had mobilized the 27th Armoured Regiment. After the Sherbrooke Regiment and the 7th/11th Hussars amalgamated in 1964, the tank has been looked after by its successor unit, the Sherbrooke Hussars.

For many years, Ernest Mingo, the tank's last commander, would make an annual visit to Sherbrooke from his home in Nova Scotia to visit Bomb and comrades from the Fusiliers, while Dutch families, grateful for the tank's role in liberating the Netherlands, sent an annual gift of tulip bulbs to Mingo and Walter White at his home in West Gore, Nova Scotia. The tank was restored in 2011, receiving plaques to reflect its battle service and a paint scheme that reflected its wartime appearance.

References

Tanks of Canada
Sherbrooke Hussars
World War II armoured fighting vehicles of Canada
Individual tanks
Operation Overlord